Bacino di San Marco from the Puntana della Dogana is a 1740-1745 oil on canvas painting by Canaletto, now in the Pinacoteca di Brera in Milan. It forms a pair with The Grand Canal looking towards Punta della Dogana from Campo Sant'Ivo (also in Pinacoteca di Brera), with both works produced in the artist's mature period just before his move to London.

It shows the Bacino di San Marco (San Marco basin) from punta della Dogana. It is more light-filled than his previous works, with clearer brushwork and showing the scene in the midday sun with more figures than in his earlier work.

References

1745 paintings
Paintings in the collection of the Pinacoteca di Brera
Paintings of Venice by Canaletto

Paintings of Venice